The 1998–99 season was the 98th season in the history of Stade Rennais F.C. and their fifth consecutive season in the top flight. The club are participating in French Division 1, Coupe de France, and Coupe de la Ligue.

Pre-season and friendlies

Competitions

Overall record

French Division 1

League table

Results summary

Results by round

Matches

Coupe de France

Coupe de la Ligue

Goalscorers 

Source:

References 

Stade Rennais F.C. seasons
Stade Rennais F.C.